The 2015–16 Eintracht Braunschweig season was the 122nd season in the club's football history. In 2015–16, the club played in the 2. Bundesliga, the second tier of German football.

Review and events

The 2015–16 season of Eintracht Braunschweig will begin on 15 June 2015 with their first training session.

The draw for the first round of the 2015–16 DFB-Pokal happened on 10 June and paired Braunschweig with 3. Liga team Hallescher FC.

On 30 June 2015, the team headed for an eight-day-long pre-season training camp in Mittersill, Salzburg, Austria.

The draw for the second round of the 2015–16 DFB-Pokal happened on 14 August and paired Braunschweig with Oberliga Baden-Württemberg side SSV Reutlingen 05.

In November 2015, sporting director Marc Arnold announced that the club would not head for a winter training camp this season.

Matches and results

Legend

Friendly matches

2. Bundesliga

League fixtures and results

League table

DFB-Pokal

Squad

Current squad

Transfers

Summer

In:

Out:

Winter

In:

Out:

Management and coaching staff 

Since 12 May 2008 Torsten Lieberknecht is the manager of Eintracht Braunschweig.

References

External links 
Eintracht Braunschweig Official Website

Eintracht Braunschweig seasons
Eintracht Braunschweig season 2015-16